Ogden Express (OGX), is an under construction  bus rapid transit (BRT) line in southern Ogden, Utah, United States. The line will be operated by the Utah Transit Authority (UTA) and will run between the Ogden Intermodal Transit Center (FrontRunner station) to the McKay-Dee Hospital, by way of Weber State University (WSU). It is anticipated to be completed by 2023. It is the third of UTA's BRT lines along the Wasatch Front. The line partially opened on August 29, 2022 between Weber State Central station and Dee Events Center station as line 602.

Description 

The Ogden Express will connect the Ogden Intermodal Transit Center with Lindquist Field, The Junction, the Ogden/Weber Municipal Building, downtown Ogden, Ogden High School, Weber State University (including the Dee Events Center), and McKay-Dee Hospital. Much of the route will run along Harrison Boulevard (Utah State Route 203). UTA had anticipated having the Ogden Express operational by 2020, but by late May 2020, construction was not expected to even begin until fall of the same year.

The BRT service will connect with Greyhound inter-city buses and the FrontRunner at Ogden Intermodal Transit Center. The FrontRunner is a commuter rail service run by UTA that operates along the Wasatch Front with service from Provo, through Salt Lake County (including Salt Lake City), Davis County, Weber County, and Ogden. The FrontRunner also connects with UTA's TRAX light rail system in the Salt Lake Valley as well as Amtrak's California Zephyr (which runs daily between Chicago, Illinois and the San Francisco Bay Area).

Plans call for the Dee Events Center Campus Shuttle Stop to be upgraded to a transit center that would serve automobiles and bicycles (with bicycle facilities), as well as connect with local bus routes.

The planned schedule is for the Ogden Express to run every 10 minutes on weekdays between 6:00 am and 5:00 pm, but reducing to every 15 minutes for the remainder of the 20–hour schedule. On weekends the frequency will be every 15 or 30 minutes.

Route 

The Ogden Express does not yet have a designated route number, but it will replace the current UTA Route 603.
The anticipated route will begin in the Ogden Intermodal Transit Center in west–central Ogden. It will then run east on 23rd Street to Washington Boulevard (U.S. Route 89) before turning south along that street. It will then head east again on 25th Street to Harrison Boulevard (Utah State Route 203) and turn south again along that street. After passing the Ogden High School, beginning at about 31st Street, the route will transition to bus–only lanes in the center of the road. At about 37th Street, the route will shift east, off Harrison Boulevard and onto a busway that cuts across main campus of WSU to continue south, passing near existing campus buildings. South of the student housing buildings, the route will pass through a residential area until it reaches the Dee Events Center. After passing just west of the Events Center, the route will turn northwest, cross Harrison Boulevard and loop counterclockwise at McKay-Dee Hospital, before returning along the same route to the Ogden Intermodal Transit Center.

History 
Planning for the project official began with the transit corridor study in November 2004. In early planning serious consideration was given to using a streetcar (similar to UTA 's S Line) to satisfy the transportation needs along the corridor, but ultimately it was decided that BRT was the better option due to the costs involved with streetcar.

On September 22, 2021, UTA officially announced the service is named the Ogden Express (OGX). Prior to the announcement, the project had been known as the 'Ogden/WSU BRT".

The line partially opened on August 29, 2022 between Weber State Central station and Dee Events Center station as line 602.

 Stations 

 See also 

 Utah Transit Authority Bus Rapid Transit
 FrontRunner''

Notes

References

External links 

 Ogden Express project page – UTA

Bus rapid transit in Utah
Transportation in Weber County, Utah
Ogden, Utah
Utah Transit Authority